Moinabad may refer to:

India
 Moinabad, Ranga Reddy district, a town in Telangana
 Moinabad mandal, Ranga Reddy district

Iran
Moinabad, Fasa, a village in Fasa County, Fars Province
Moinabad, Kazerun, a village in Kazerun County, Fars Province
Moinabad, Ardestan, a village in Ardestan County, Isfahan Province
Moinabad, Nain, a village in Nain County, Isfahan Province
Moinabad, Divandarreh, a village in Divandarreh County, Kurdistan Province
Moinabad, Sanandaj, a village in Sanandaj County, Kurdistan Province
Moinabad, Markazi, a village in Tafresh County, Markazi Province
Moinabad-e Bala, a village in Mashhad County, Razavi Khorasan Province
Moinabad-e Sofla, a village in Mashhad County, Razavi Khorasan Province
Moinabad, Semnan, a village in Damghan County, Semnan Province
Moinabad, South Khorasan, a village in Zirkuh County, South Khorasan Province
Moinabad, Tehran, a village in Pishva County, Tehran Province

Pakistan
 Moinabad, Karachi, a neighbourhood in Karachi